East Slavic may refer to:

 East Slavic languages, one of three branches of the Slavic languages
 East Slavs, a subgroup of Slavic peoples who speak the East Slavic languages

See also
 Old East Slavic, a language used during the 10th–15th centuries by East Slavs

Language and nationality disambiguation pages